Masuo (written: 益男, 斗雄 or 満寿夫) is a masculine Japanese given name. Notable people with the name include:

 (born 1958), Japanese actor and voice actor
 (born 1947), Japanese sumo wrestler
 (1934–1997), Japanese artist, writer and film director

Masuo (written: 増尾) is also a Japanese surname. Notable people with the surname include:
 (born 1986), Japanese actor

See also
Masuo Station (disambiguation), multiple train stations in Japan

Japanese-language surnames
Japanese masculine given names